Tinnoset Station is a disused railway station on the Tinnoset Line located at Tinnoset in Notodden, Norway. At the station's docks wagons were transferred from trains to the Tinnsjø railway ferry.

The station building is built in a nationally romantic style with logs, designed by architect Thorvald Astrup. It was finished in 1908 but did not open until August 9, 1909. It remained staffed until 1988. On January 1, 1991, the station closed after all passenger traffic was ended on the Tinnoset Line, as was freight traffic the following summer.

References

Railway stations on the Tinnoset Line
Railway stations in Notodden
Railway stations opened in 1909
Railway stations closed in 1991
Disused railway stations in Norway
1909 establishments in Norway
1991 disestablishments in Norway
National Romantic architecture in Norway
Art Nouveau railway stations